Summer Pulse 2004 (SP04) was the codename for a worldwide surge deployment that served as the first full-scale test of the United States Navy's then-new Fleet Response Plan (FRP). During Summer Pulse 2004, a total of seven carrier strike groups were underway at the same time in five different theaters of operations. This number of underway carrier strike groups had not been matched since the six carrier battle groups deployed during Operation Desert Storm. In addition to the carriers, the Navy also deployed 17 submarines and one submarine tender.

The FRP was designed to allow the Navy to provide up to seven carrier strike groups (CSG) to support any contingency worldwide in 30 days.  The plan allowed for two more CSGs to be ready within three months to reinforce or relieve the forces initially deployed. This allows for a continuous presence and the ability to swiftly respond to different crisis situations. Summer Pulse 2004 also allowed the U.S. Navy to exercise the logistics and shore infrastructure needed to execute a large-scale surge operation, as well as the operational concepts in its Sea Power 21 strategy.

During Summer Pulse 2004, U.S. naval forces participated in over 13 individual military exercises involving more than 23 allies and coalition partners, as well as other branches of the U.S. Armed Forces, while operating in the Atlantic and Pacific Oceans; the Arabian, Baltic, Mediterranean, North and Red Seas; and the Sea of Japan and Persian Gulf.

Background

Developing upon the lessons learned from Operation Iraqi Freedom and the global war on terrorism, the U.S. Navy introduced the Fleet Response Plan in 2003. The FRP was described as a new concept of planning and organizing fleet assets for deployment that replaced the 18-month Inter-Deployment Readiness Cycle used during the Cold War. The objective of the FRP was to provide six aircraft carrier strike groups that can be deployed or be ready to deploy within 30 days and another two aircraft carrier strike groups ready to deploy within 90 days.  During his meeting with the Navy Times editorial board, Chief of Naval Operations Admiral Vern Clark (pictured) summarized the objective of the Fleet Response Plan by noting:

I would rather muster two battle groups for three months and do something really significant internationally, and cooperate with partners in training and so forth, than just go over and hang out for six months without purpose. The position that I’m pushing is that we should be less interested in presence and more interested in presence with a purpose.

The Fleet Response Plan allowed the U.S. Navy to be ready to surge as well as be able to vary the lengths of deployments, providing a more flexible, ready to deploy capability.  By increasing the duration of time that a ship could be deployed, the operational availability of several ships will always overlap, providing the Navy with the capability of deploying multiple ships or battle groups simultaneously. The FRP also involved new ways of operating, training, manning, and maintaining the fleet, resulting in increased force readiness and the ability to provide significant combat power in a crisis situation as well as reinforce U.S. relationships and interoperability in five theaters of operations. The U.S. Fleet Forces Command was tasked to lead in the implementation of the FRP.

Theaters of operations

U.S. Second Fleet: Western Atlantic and Latin America

Gringo-Gaucho

On 27 May 2004, the carrier Ronald Reagan departed from its former home base of Naval Station Norfolk, Virginia, which was also the headquarters for the U.S. Second Fleet. During its two-month-long inter-fleet transfer, Reagan participated in Summer Pulse 2004, as well as operating with the U.S. Southern Command and U.S. Northern Command, within the U.S. Second Fleet's area of responsibility. During this inter-fleet transfer, several squadrons of Carrier Air Wing Eleven (CVW-11) were temporarily embarked on board the Ronald Reagan. The principal purpose for embarking these CVW-11 squadrons was to complete their training evolutions prior to the strike group's first Western Pacific (WESTPAC) deployment.

On 17 June 2004, two Super Étendard jet fighters and three S-2T Turbo Trackers antisubmarine aircraft from Argentine Naval Aviation carried out touch-and-go landings on the Reagans flight deck during Gringo-Gaucho exercises (pictured). The Reagan also participated in a SIFOREX (Silent Forces) exercise with the Peruvian Navy prior to its port visit to Callao, Peru, on 9 July 2004. The most significant naval exercise involving the Ronald Reagan Carrier Battle Group was UNITAS 45-04, the largest multinational naval exercise held in Latin America.

Reagan subsequently paid port visits to Valparaíso, Chile, and Callao, Peru, before arriving at its new homeport of Naval Air Station North Island, California, on 23 July 2004, having changed its operational control ("chop") to the U.S. Third Fleet.

Operation Blinding Storm

On 7 June 2004, the John F. Kennedy carrier strike group (probably Carrier Group 6) departed Naval Station Mayport, Florida, to participate in Combined Joint Task Force Exercise 04-2 – "Operation Blinding Storm", to complete the strike group's certification to deploy.

Held between 14 and 18 June, Blinding Storm marked the first Joint National Training Capability (JNTC) integration event, with training focused on functional coalition component commands. All branches of the U.S. armed forces were involved, as well as the British light aircraft carrier . A total of 28,000 allied military personnel participated in Operation Blinding Storm, including and more than 60 coalition ships and hundreds of aircraft.  Coordinating the complex command and control links encompassing land, amphibious, air and maritime forces was one of the exercise's wins. It included an opposed night amphibious landing and live fire exercises, concluding on 21 June 2004. That day, the John F. Kennedy carrier strike group was certified as being combat ready for its upcoming deployment.

Following Blinding Storm, John F. Kennedy carrier strike group began its overseas deployment.  The carrier strike group paid a port visit to Malta between 26 and 30 June 2004, before transiting the Suez Canal from 2–3 July 2004, joining the U.S. Fifth Fleet. The nuclear-powered attack submarine  deployed with the John F. Kennedy carrier strike group during Summer Pulsie 2004.

U.S. Third Fleet: Northern and Central Pacific
On 24 May 2004, Carrier Group 7, led by John C. Stennis, departed Naval Station San Diego, California, for its 2004 Western Pacific (WESTPAC) deployment as part of Summer Pulse 2004. The nuclear-powered submarine  deployed with the John C. Stennis strike group during Summer Pulse 2004.

Northern Edge 2004

The strike group's first major undertaking was Exercise Northern Edge 2004.  Held from 7 June through 14 June 2004, Northern Edge 2004, focused on air-centric tactics and procedures with an emphasis on air-to-air, air-to-ground, and on personnel recovery operations in remote areas of the Pacific Alaska Range Complex (PARC) near Fairbanks, Alaska, and over water in the Gulf of Alaska.  The carrier Stennis paid a port visit to Esquimalt, British Columbia between 18 and 21 June 2004, and the carrier strike group also participated bi-lateral exercises with the Canadian Navy between 22 and 29 June 2004.<ref name=CVN74CommandHistory2004>{{cite web |author= Captain David H. Buss, USN |title= 2004 Command History, Enclosure (2): Command History for USS John C. Stennis (CVN-74) for period 1 January to 31 December 2004 |url= http://www.history.navy.mil/shiphist/j/cvn-74/2004.pdf |work= USS John C. Stennis |publisher= Naval History & Heritage Command |location= Washington, DC |page= 6 |date= 14 February 2005 |access-date= 2010-09-07 |quote= Hereafter referred to as USS John C. Stennis (CVN-74) 2004 Command History. |url-status= dead |archive-url= https://web.archive.org/web/20110628200653/http://www.history.navy.mil/shiphist/j/cvn-74/2004.pdf |archive-date= 28 June 2011 }}</ref>

RIMPAC 2004
The Stennis CSG paid a port visit to Pearl Harbor between 22 and 26 June 2004, prior to RIMPAC 2004. The biennial Rim of the Pacific Exercise (Exercise RIMPAC) was two-weeks long, multinational, and involved 40 ships, seven submarines, 100 aircraft, and nearly 18,000 military personnel from seven nations.  RIMPAC 2004 focused on multinational training while building trust and cooperation among the participating naval partners (pictured).  The carrier John C Stennis was the flagship for the Multinational Task Force Commander, Rear Admiral Patrick Walsh, Commander Carrier Group 7.

U.S. Fifth Fleet: Persian Gulf and North Arabian Sea
On 30 January 2004, the George Washington carrier strike group departed Naval Station Norfolk, Virginia, for its 2004, deployment to the U.S. Fifth Fleet. On 16 February 2004, the George Washington carrier strike group completed a 16-hour transit of the Suez Canal and entered the U.S. Fifth Fleet area of responsibility.

Operation Vigilant Resolve

 
On 20 February 2004, the George Washington carrier group transited the Bab-el-Mandeb strait, leaving the Red Sea, and the strike group set course for the Arabian Sea. On 28 February 2004, the George Washington carrier strike group transited through the Strait of Hormuz and entered into the Persian Gulf.  The carrier George Washington paid a port visit to Jebel Ali, UAE, between 14 and 19 March 2004.

On 9 April 2004, a second port visit to Jebel Ali was cancelled, and the George Washington carrier strike group was ordered to remain on station in the Persian Gulf after fighting intensified between Coalition Forces and insurgents around the city of Fallujah in the Iraqi province of Al Anbar. As part of Operation Vigilant Resolve, on 28 April 2004, Carrier Air Wing Seven squadrons VFA-136, VFA-131, VF-11, and VF-143 flew combat air sorties against insurgents in Fallujah.  During this combat sortie, CVW-7 aircraft dropped 13 GBU-12 Paveway II laser-guided bombs on insurgent positions while continuing to provide combat air support to the 1st Marine Expeditionary Force.

On 25 April 2004, the George Washington carrier strike group steamed back to the Persian Gulf after terrorists attacked the Khor Al Amaya Oil Terminal (KAAOT) off the coast of Basra, Iraq.  The strike group also provided search, rescue, and recovery support in the aftermath of the boarding incident involving the U.S. patrol ship .  The carrier George Washington subsequently paid a port visit to Jebel Ali between 7–11 May 2004.

Beginning 2 June 2004, the George Washington carrier strike group (pictured) began its participation in Summer Pulse 2004, which continued until the group's return to Norfolk on 26 July; the carrier George Washington was called the tip of the spear for the entire surge exercise.

Operation Iraqi Freedom

On 5 July 2004, the George Washington strike group departed the Persian Gulf. During its nearly five-month deployment to the Fifth Fleet, the George Washington carrier strike group spent 231 days away from home port and steamed 70,750 nautical miles.  Carrier Air Wing Seven (CVW-7) amassed nearly 8,800 sorties, including 1,500 in direct support of Operation Iraqi Freedom, expended approximately 164,000 pounds (74,389 kg) of ordnance, and flew more than 21,000 flight hours. Destroyer Squadron 28 executed 200 Maritime Interdiction Operations (MIO) boardings and logged more than 12,000 surface contacts in the Persian Gulf.USS George Washington (CVN-73) Command History 2004. pp. 3-6, 19.

On 10 July 2004, Carrier Air Wing Seventeen (CVW-17), flying from John F. Kennedy, launched air strikes supporting Multi-national Corps-Iraq and Iraqi forces. On 20 July, CVW-17 aircraft destroyed two anti-Iraqi positions in the strike group's first active engagement of anti-Iraqi targets, using GBU-12 and GBU-32 guided bombs on the enemy positions. On 20 November 2004, the Harry S. Truman carrier strike group relieved the John F. Kennedy carrier strike group (pictured).

During its 2004 deployment with the Fifth Fleet, the John F. Kennedy carrier strike group launched 8,296 sorties for a total of 21,824 flight hours, with 4,396 sorties and 11,607 of the flight hours in direct support of Operation Iraqi Freedom.  During the course of operations in Iraq, 54,000 pounds (24,494 kg) of ordnance were dropped by the jets of CVW-17 squadrons. Carrier Air Wing 17 aircraft flew a combined total of 6,054 sorties in support of Operation Iraqi Freedom (OIF) and Operation Enduring Freedom – Afghanistan (OEF-A).  During the height of operations, CVW-17 aircraft flew an average of 38 missions per day.

The John F. Kennedy carrier strike group returned from its deployment on 7 December 2004.

U.S. Sixth Fleet: Eastern Atlantic and Mediterranean Sea

On 2 June 2004, the Harry S. Truman carrier strike group, including the nuclear-powered submarine , departed Naval Station Norfolk, deploying to the Mediterranean Sea as part of Summer Pulse 2004. While still in the mid-Atlantic, the strike group came under command of the U.S. Sixth Fleet on 24 June 2004, and then paid a port visit to Naples between 2 and 6 July 2004.

On 3 June 2004, the Enterprise carrier strike group departed Norfolk for its trans-Atlantic phase of Summer Pulse 2004. The nuclear-powered submarine  deployed with the Enterprise carrier strike group for Summer Pulse 2004. During Summer Pulse 2004, the Enterprise carrier strike group participated in NATO exercises Neo Tapon and Joint Maritime Course 04-2 before joining the Harry S. Truman carrier strike group for Operation Medshark/Majestic Eagle 2004. Following Summer Pulse 2004, the Enterprise carrier strike group returned to Norfolk on 23 July 2004. The Harry S. Truman carrier strike group re-entered the U.S. Second Fleet's area of responsibility on 21 July 2004, and it returned to Norfolk on 25 July 2004.

Neo Tapon
Between 11 and 14 June 2004, the Enterprise carrier strike group participated in Neo Tapon, a Spanish-hosted NATO exercise, with the carrier Enterprise serving as the exercise's flagship. The Enterprise carrier strike group operated with British, Dutch, French, Italian, Moroccan, and Portuguese forces, as well as ships from Standing Naval Forces Atlantic and Standing Naval Forces Mediterranean, testing air and surface warfare and strike mission capabilities.  The Neo Tapon exercise tested NATO surface warfare, air warfare, and strike mission capabilities, as well as the strike group's ability to implement plans quickly.

Joint Maritime Course 04-2
Steaming northward, the Enterprise carrier strike group participated in Joint Maritime Course 04-2 (JMC 04-2) exercises, a NATO operation hosted by the Joint Maritime Operations Training Staff, between 19 and 30 June 2004. More than 50 ships from Norway, Sweden, Germany, Belgium, the Netherlands, the United Kingdom, France, Spain, Germany, and the United States participated in the exercises while operating off the coast of Scotland.

The JMC involved two distinct phases, the first of which was the training exercise.  During this phase, the guided-missile cruiser  conducting gun-support operations and air defense coordination and Carrier Air Wing One conducting air operations with live ordnance on firing ranges.  The second phase was the operational phase, with the 50 participating ships will split into two task groups. Enterprise served as one task group flagship, and the commander of the Belgian and the Netherlands task group command the other force.  The fast logistics support ship  provided logistic support, and it also acted as a high-value asset during the exercise. The carrier Enterprise made its first port visit at Portsmouth between 2 and 6 July 2004.

Operation Medshark/Majestic Eagle 2004

On 11 July 2004, the Enterprise and Harry S. Truman carrier strike groups participated in NATO Operation Medshark/Majestic Eagle 2004 (MS/ME04), held between 11 and 16 July 2004, in the eastern Atlantic Ocean off Morocco.  The exercise included ships and aircraft from the United States, United Kingdom, France, Spain, The Netherlands, Turkey, Italy, Germany, Portugal, and Morocco under the overall command of Vice Admiral Henry G. Ulrich III, USN, Commander, Naval Striking and Support Forces NATO.

Hosted by Morocco, recently designated as a Major non-NATO ally by U.S. President George W. Bush, the objective of Operation Medshark/Majestic Eagle was to develop interoperability and build military relationships between the participating ten allied nations. The exercise was the first to use the Cap Draa training area off southwest Morocco to conduct live fire training exercises. The first phase involved sea-control war games between the two carrier strike groups, and the second phase simulated choke-point transit through a strait. Operation Medshark/Majestic Eagle involved more than 20,000 personnel, almost 150 aircraft, and 30 ships from 10 nations led by the carriers Enterprise, Principe De Asturias, Truman, and Giuseppe Garibaldi. The nuclear-powered submarines Albuquerque (pictured), Miami, and  also participated in Operation MEDSHARK/Majestic Eagle. To provide support for those submarines, the submarine tender   sailed west from Italy. She berthed at Rota, Spain, spent eight exercise days underway, and then briefly revisited Rota before heading back for Italy.

U.S. Seventh Fleet: Western Pacific

On 19 July 2004, Carrier Group Five, with its staff aboard Kitty Hawk, departed from Yokosuka, Japan, to participate in Summer Pulse 2004. While underway, Carrier Air Wing Five executed carrier landing qualifications (CQ) for its naval aviators.

The Stennis and Kitty Hawk groups subsequently operated together in Joint Air and Sea Exercise 2004 (JASEX 04) (pictured).USS John C. Stennis (CVN-74) 2004 Command History, p. 6. The combat stores ships  supported both carrier strike groups, delivering 2,576 cargo pallets during the months of July and August. This second annual joint exercise involved air and sea training events focused on integrating joint training. JASEX 04 also included training to improve interoperability and teamwork between the two carrier strike groups, as well as with land-based Air Force and Marine Corps units forward deployed to in the Western Pacific. JASEX 04 ended on 15 August 2004.

The Stennis carrier strike group returned to San Diego on 1 November 2004.  The Kitty Hawk carrier strike group completed its Tailored Ship's Training Availability (TSTA) Phase III training exercises and returned to Yokosuka on 7 September 2004, concluding its participation in Summer Pulse 2004.

Combat operations and exercises

Force composition
Carrier battle groups

Carrier air wings

Surface warships, submarines, and fleet auxiliaries

Aftermath
Regarding the success of Summer Sure 2004, Rear Admiral James D. Kelly, Commander Carrier Group Five (COMCARGRU-5), noted:

Summer Pulse '04 and the [FRP] are not about how often and how long we can deploy. They are about being able to answer the nation’s call in force – six CSGs in 30 days and two more within three months – by providing credible combat power where and when it is needed. Summer Pulse '04 is the proof of our readiness.

Summer Pulse 2004 drew criticism from Chalmers Johnson who stated that the U.S. Navy's multi-carrier surge deployment looked "like the peacetime equivalent of the Normandy landings and may well end in a disaster" in his editorial essay published in the Los Angeles Times on 15 July 2004.  He also characterized Summer Pulse 2004 as a "modern rerun of 19th century gunboat diplomacy" directed at the People's Republic of China and timed for the upcoming 2004 U.S. presidential election that "sounds like a last hurrah of the neocons." Johnson also asserted that all seven U.S. Navy carrier strike groups were being deployed to the Chinese coast near Taiwan, prompting the Los Angeles Times'' to issue the following correction on 4 August 2004:

A commentary by Chalmers Johnson on 15 July on a U.S. naval exercise and China's potential reaction incorrectly stated that seven carrier groups in "Summer Pulse 2004" would be off the Chinese coast near Taiwan. The Navy says the carrier groups will be deployed globally, with only one in the western Pacific.

Although there was some congressional criticism, the Fleet Response Plan remains the operational cornerstone for United States Navy in the early 21st century, with Summer Pulse 2004 being its first operational test.

In Fiscal Year 2015, The United States Navy introduced a new Optimized Fleet Response Plan (O-FRP) with the  being the first aircraft to use this new plan.  The Optimized Fleet Response Plan is designed to align carrier strike groups to a new 36-month training and deployment cycle. All required maintenance, training, evaluations, plus a single eight-month overseas deployment will be scheduled throughout this 36-month cycle in order to reduce costs while increasing overall fleet readiness.  Also, this new plan will streamline the inspection and evaluation process while maintaining a surge capacity for emergency deployments.  The ultimate objective is to reduce time at sea while increasing in-port time from 49% to 68%.  While initially to be used by U.S. Navy carrier strike groups, the Optimized Fleet Response Plan will be adopted for all fleet operations.

See also
 Great White Fleet
 Operation Sea Orbit
 U.S. Carrier Group tactics

Notes
Footnotes

Citations

References

Further reading

External links
 

United States Navy in the 21st century
Military exercises involving the United States
2004 in military history